Trout Lake Water Aerodrome , located on Sambaa Kʼe, formerly Trout Lake, Northwest Territories, Canada is open from the middle of June until the middle of October.

See also
Sambaa Kʼe Aerodrome

References

Registered aerodromes in the Dehcho Region
Seaplane bases in the Northwest Territories